Anouska Hempel, Lady Weinberg (born 1941) is a New Zealand-born film and television actress turned hotelier and interior designer. She is sometimes credited as Anoushka Hempel.

Early life
Hempel is of Russian and Swiss German ancestry and has speculated that she was born on a boat en route from Papua New Guinea to New Zealand. Her family emigrated to New Zealand where she was born. They later moved to Cronulla, south of Sydney in Australia, where her father owned a garage. As a teenager in the mid-1950s, Hempel attended Sutherland High School. In 1962, she moved to England carrying only £10.

Acting 
Hempel's first film appearance was in the Hammer Horror film The Kiss of the Vampire (1963). In 1969, she appeared in the James Bond film On Her Majesty's Secret Service as one of the "angels of death". Thereafter, she appeared in several films including Scars of Dracula (1970), The Magnificent Seven Deadly Sins (1971), Go for a Take (1972), Tiffany Jones (1973), Russ Meyer's controversial, soft pornographic film Black Snake (1973), Double Exposure (1977), and Lady Oscar (1979). In the 1970s, Hempel appeared in one episode of the BBC series The Lotus Eaters. She appeared in the science-fiction TV series' UFO ("Mindbender", 1970) and Space: 1999 ("The Metamorph", 1976). During her career as an actress, she appeared as a regular panellist  alongside Patrick Mower for two series of the murder mystery game show Whodunnit?, between 1975 and 1976.

Partial filmography
On Her Majesty's Secret Service (1969) – The Australian Girl
The Breaking of Bumbo (1970) – Debutante
Scars of Dracula (1970) – Tania
UFO (1970) - Tamara Paulson
The Magnificent Seven Deadly Sins (1971) – Blonde (segment "Lust")
Carry on at Your Convenience (1971) – New Canteen Girl (uncredited)
Go for a Take (1972) – Suzi Eckmann
Black Snake (1973) – Lady Susan Walker
Tiffany Jones (1973) – Tiffany Jones
The Doll (BBC short serial) (1975)- Phyllis Du SalleDouble Exposure (1977) – SimoneLady Oscar (1979) – Jeanne Vallois / Jeanne de la Motte

Hotel and design 
After finishing acting, Hempel has embarked in a career as a hotelier and interior designer. In 2002, she was ranked by Architectural Digest'' as one of the top 100 interior designers and architects in the world.

Hotels
Hempel has established four hotels. Blakes Hotel was created in 1978 as one of the world's first luxury boutique hotels. Based in South Kensington, it is well known for its design, quality of service and privacy. The hotel's restaurant has become a destination in its own right, featuring a fusion of Hempel's favourite cuisines of Japanese and Italian. Her second hotel, the Hempel Hotel, was noted as a minimalist hotel. Blakes Amsterdam was opened in 1999, drawing inspiration from Amsterdam's historic Dutch East India Company.

Personal life
In 1964, she married Constantine Hempel, with whom she had a son and daughter.  He was a journalist and property developer who was killed in 1973, crashing his car into a basement in Pimlico. Hempel and her second husband, theatrical producer Bill Kenwright, divorced after two years of marriage in 1980. Later that year, Hempel married financier Mark Weinberg, with whom she has a son, Jonathan. She appears in a photographic portrait by Bryan Wharton on display in the National Portrait Gallery.

References

External links

Blakes Hotels
The Hempel Hotel
Warapuru Hotel
Anouska Hempel - National Portrait Gallery — National Portrait Gallery

1941 births
20th-century New Zealand actresses
20th-century New Zealand people
21st-century New Zealand architects
New Zealand landscape architects
Living people
Modernist designers
New Zealand emigrants to the United Kingdom
New Zealand fashion designers
New Zealand women fashion designers
New Zealand film actresses
New Zealand hoteliers
New Zealand interior designers
New Zealand people of Russian descent
New Zealand people of Swiss-German descent
New Zealand socialites
New Zealand television actresses
People from Lower Hutt
Women hoteliers